is a railway station on the Hachinohe Line in the town of Hirono, Kunohe District, Iwate Prefecture, Japan. It is operated by  the East Japan Railway Company (JR East).

Lines
Kadonohama Station is served by the Hachinohe Line, and is 29.5 kilometers from the terminus of the line at Hachinohe Station.

Station layout
Kadonohama Station has a single ground-level side platform serving one bi-directional track. There is a small rain shelter built on top of the platform, but there is no station building. The station is unattended.

History
Kadonohama Station opened on August 5, 1954. On April 1, 1987, upon the privatization of the Japanese National Railways, the station came under the operational control of JR East.

Surrounding area
National Route 45

See also
 List of railway stations in Japan

References

External links
 

Railway stations in Iwate Prefecture
Hirono, Iwate
Hachinohe Line
Railway stations in Japan opened in 1954
Stations of East Japan Railway Company